The 1918 California Golden Bears football team was an American football team that represented the University of California, Berkeley in the Pacific Coast Conference (PCC) during the 1918 college football season. In their third year under head coach Andy Smith, the team compiled a 7–2 record (2–0 against PCC opponents), won the PCC championship, and outscored its opponents by a combined total of 186 to 62.

Schedule

References

California
California Golden Bears football seasons
Pac-12 Conference football champion seasons
California California Golden Bears football